Algyroides is a genus of lizards of the family Lacertidae.

Species
The following species are recognised as being valid.
Algyroides fitzingeri  – Fitzinger's algyroides
Algyroides hidalgoi  – Spanish algyroides, Spanish keeled lizard
Algyroides moreoticus  – Greek algyroides, Greek keeled lizard
Algyroides nigropunctatus  – Dalmatian algyroides, blue-throated keeled lizard

References

 
Lizard genera
Taxa named by Gabriel Bibron
Taxa named by Jean Baptiste Bory de Saint-Vincent